Shaun Lopez is an American music producer, composer, and musician.

Life and career
Shaun is a founding member and guitarist for post-hardcore band Far.

After a number of local releases, including their first demo tape, Sweat A River, Live No Lies, and two independent albums Listening Game and Quick, they signed to Epic/Immortal Records and released their major label debut, Tin Cans With Strings To You.

Their second major label LP, Water & Solutions, was released in 1998. Thanks to the single, "Mother Mary", they attracted a large cult following. The more melodic sound showcased on this album is increasingly cited as an influence on present-day "emo rock" bands(i.e. Thursday, Biffy Clyro, Jimmy Eat World). Certainly, it was a departure from their earlier, much more hardcore sound, though it is still far from the emo-pop that it would quickly come to inspire.

After their split in 1999, Lopez briefly played in an early version of Rival Schools, headed by former Quicksand frontman, Walter Schreifels. He also auditioned for a spot in Foo Fighters, a job that was ultimately given to Chris Shiflett of No Use For A Name/Me First and the Gimme Gimmes.

Shortly thereafter, Shaun picked up the microphone and formed The Revolution Smile, which, after putting out the self-produced At War with Plastic EP, and self-produced full-length, We Are In This Alone, was signed to Geffen Records. In 2003, they released Above The Noise, which was produced by Shaun and Dave Sardy(producer of Far's Water & Solutions), and mixed by Andy Wallace.  They toured across United States and Europe, and were featured on Ozzfest and Van's Warped Tour.  A third self-produced album entitled Summer Ever was released in September 2006.

In addition to his production work with The Revolution Smile, he has produced a number of other bands, including Giant Drag, The Black Pacific, and Deftones.

In 2009, a Far reunion was announced. Several live shows were played, and an album produced by Lopez was released on May 25, 2010. Their Lopez produced cover of Ginuwine's hit Pony made it to the top 40 in modern rock charts. He has also mixed B-Sides for Deftones forthcoming release, Diamond Eyes.

In 2011, Shaun formed ††† (Crosses) with Chuck Doom and Chino Moreno from Deftones. The group played their first shows on a short tour in California, including cities Pomona, San Diego, Sacramento, and San Francisco.  
Crosses played in the Lollapalooza Chile festival on March 31 - April 1, 2012.  They also played in the Quilmes Rock festival on April 3, 2012.

Personal life
Shaun lives in Los Angeles, CA with his wife Amy Chance.  He owns and works out of The Airport studio.

Discography

Producer

Chon
Grow (2015) - Mixer (Sumerian Records)

Senses Fail
Renacer (2013)

Secret Empire (Storm Command) 2013

VersaEmerge
Another Atmosphere Preview (2012) - Producer (Fueled by Ramen)
Neon (2014) - Producer (Independent)
Rob Zombie
Mondo Sex Head (2012) - Dragula ††† remix

†††
Batman: Arkham City - The Album (2011) - Composer, Producer, Engineer, Mixer, Guitar, Keyboards, Programming (WaterTower Music)
EP †† (2012) - Composer, Producer, Engineer, Mixer, Guitar, Keyboards, Programming
EP † (2011) - Composer, Producer, Engineer, Mixer, Guitar, Keyboards, Programming

Whitechapel
A New Era of Corruption (2010) - Engineer

Far
At Night We Live (2010) - Composer, Producer, Engineer, Mixer, Guitar (Vagrant Records)
Pony single (2008) (#40 US Modern Rock) - Composer, Producer, Engineer, Mixer, Guitar

The Black Pacific
The Black Pacific (album) (2010) - Producer, Engineer, Mixer, Guitar, Vocals (background) (SideOneDummy Records)

Deftones 
Diamond Eyes Deluxe Edition (2010) - Mixing (Warner Bros. Records)
Saturday Night Wrist (2006) - Composer, Producer, Vocal Producer (Warner Bros. Records)
Dead Sara
The Airport Sessions (EP) (2008) - Producer, Engineer, Mixer
Secondhand Serenade
A Twist in My Story (2008) - Mixing (Glassnote Records)
We the Living
Heights of The Heavens (2007) - Engineer
Demon Hunter
Storm the Gates of Hell (2007) - Audio Engineer, Audio Production, Engineer, Guitar Engineer, Guitar Producer, Producer, Theremin (Solid State Records)
Will Haven 
The Hierophant (2007) - Producer, Engineer, Mixer, additional Vocals (Bieler Brothers Records)
Saosin
Voices UK 7" (2007) - Recorded By (Capitol Records)
Lupe Fiasco
Lupe Fiasco's Food & Liquor (2006) - Composer (Atlantic Records)
Tycho
Past is Prologue (2006) - Mixer (Merck Records)
Giant Drag
Hearts and Unicorns B Sides (2006) - Producer, Engineer (Kickball Records)
The X-Ecutioners
Scarface: The World Is Yours (2006) - Guitar, Mixer (Vivendi Universal)
The Revolution Smile
Summer Ever (2006) - Composer, Producer, Engineer, Mixer, Vocals, Guitar
Above The Noise (2003) - Composer, Producer, Engineer, Vocals, Guitar (Geffen Records)
We Are In This Alone (2002) - Composer, Producer, Engineer, Mixer, Vocals, Guitar
At War with Plastic (2001) - Composer, Producer, Engineer, Mixer, Vocals, Guitar

Musician

Full albums
Far - At Night We Live (2010)
The Revolution Smile - Summer Ever (2006)
The Revolution Smile - Above The Noise (2003)
The Revolution Smile - We Are In This Alone (2002)
Far - Water & Solutions (1998)
Far - Tin Cans With Strings To You (1996)
Far - Quick (1994)
Far - Listening Game (1992)

EPs
††† - EP †† (2012)
††† - EP † (2011)
The Revolution Smile - At War with Plastic (2001)
Far - Soon (1997)

Promos
Far - The System (1998)
Far - Mother Mary (1998)
Far - Love, American Style (1996)
Far - What I've Wanted To Say (1996)
Far - In The Aisle, Yelling (1996)

7"s
Far - Mother Mary (1998)
Far - Far / Incubus split w/ Water and Solutions (1997)
Far - Far Does Madonna (w/ Sea Pigs) (1996)
Far - Boring Life (1995)

References

External links
††† (Crosses)
Far
Shaun Lopez studio tour

American rock singers
Singers from California
American indie rock musicians
Record producers from California
Living people
Year of birth missing (living people)